Knockaird is a village on the Isle of Lewis in the parish of Ness, in the Outer Hebrides, Scotland. It is the highest point in Port of Ness and is home to Dùn Èistean an ancient ruined fort on a small island that is joined by a bridge. Dùn Èistean is traditionally known as a stronghold of the Clan Morrison of Lewis. Knockaird is within the parish of Barvas. The B8014 travels through the settlement, between Port of Ness and Eoropie. The Clach Stein standing stones are situated between Knockaird and Port of Ness.

References

External links

Galson Estate - Knockaird
Canmore - Lewis, Knockaird site record
Canmore - Lewis, Ness, Clach Stein site record

Villages in the Isle of Lewis